Alakamış is a village in the İdil District of Şırnak Province in Turkey. The village is populated by Kurds of the Hemikan tribe and had a population of 693 in 2021.

References 

Villages in İdil District
Kurdish settlements in Şırnak Province